The 1959 San Diego mayoral election was held on March 10, 1959, to elect the mayor for San Diego, California, United Dtates. The incumbent mayor, Charles Dail, stood for reelection to a second term. In the primary election, Dail received a majority of the votes and was elected mayor outright with no need for a run-off.

Candidates
Charles Dail
James W. Morgan
Gerard A. Dougherty
Robert Lewis Stevenson
Kent Parker
Juan Rivera Rosario

Campaign
Dail stood for re-election to a second term. On March 10, 1959, he came first in the primary election with 63.4 percent of the vote, more than 45 percent higher than James W. Morgan, his nearest competitor. Because Dail received a majority of the vote, there was no need for a run-off election, and he was consequently re-elected to the office of the mayor.

Primary election results

General election results
Because Dail received a majority of the vote in the primary, no run-off election was held.

References

1959
1959 in California
1959 United States mayoral elections
1959
March 1959 events in the United States